Jael and Sisera is a 1911 French silent film directed by Henri Andréani. The film portrays the biblical story of Jael and Sisera, found in the fourth and fifth chapters of the Book of Judges in the Bible.

External links

1911 films
Films based on the Hebrew Bible
Religious epic films
French silent short films
Book of Judges people
French black-and-white films
Silent adventure films
1910s French films